Greci can refer to:

People
José Greci (1941–2017), Italian actress

Places
Italy
Greci, Campania, a comune in the Province of Avellino

Romania
Greci, Mehedinți, a commune in Mehedinţi County
Greci, Tulcea, a commune in Tulcea County
 Greci, a village in Petrești, Dâmbovița
 Greci, a village in Osica de Sus Commune, Olt County
 Greci, a village in Schitu, Olt
 Greci, a village in Mateești Commune, Vâlcea County
Greci (river), tributary of the Măcin Branch of the Danube in Romania
Greci, the highest peak of the Măcin Mountains
Surdila-Greci, a commune in Brăila County